Svein Thorleif Thøgersen (born 23 June 1946) is a retired Norwegian rower. Competing in double sculls with Frank Hansen he won silver medals at the 1971 European Championships and 1972 Munich Olympics.

References

1946 births
Living people
Norwegian male rowers
Olympic rowers of Norway
Olympic silver medalists for Norway
Rowers at the 1972 Summer Olympics
Olympic medalists in rowing
Medalists at the 1972 Summer Olympics